Head of the Hawk is the second studio album by the Australian rock band Bluejuice, released through Dew Process on 18 September 2009. The album was recorded with producer Chris Shaw in Sydney's Big Jesus Burger studios in 2009.

Reception
Rolling Stone Australia gave the album three and a half stars out of five. Time Out Sydney rated the album four out of five stars.

Track listing
 "Head of the Hawk" — 2:44
 "Miss Johnston" — 3:16
 "Broken Leg" — 3:12
 "Little Emperor" — 3:08
 "(Ain't) Telling the Truth" — 2:43
 "Facelift" — 2:08
 "Medication" — 2:48
 "Knife Fight" — 2:25
 "Work" — 2:47
 "The Devil" — 2:04
 "We Can Get Around It" — 2:50

Charts

Certifications

Release history

References

2009 albums
Bluejuice albums